MouseCraft is an adventure indie 3D video game, developed and published by Poland-based game studio Crunching Koalas, for Microsoft Windows, PlayStation 4, PlayStation Vita, Nintendo Switch and Xbox One.

Gameplay
MouseCraft has 80 levels. Players can create their own maps with a Level Editor.

References

External links
Official website

2014 video games
Adventure games
Indie video games
Windows games
PlayStation 4 games
Ouya games
Video games about mice and rats